This is a list of Manx Twenty20 International cricketers.

In April 2018, the ICC decided to grant full Twenty20 International (T20I) status to all its members. Therefore, all Twenty20 matches played between Isle of Man and other ICC members after 1 January 2019 will be eligible for T20I status.

This list comprises all members of the Isle of Man cricket team who have played at least one T20I match. It is initially arranged in the order in which each player won his first Twenty20 cap. Where more than one player won his first Twenty20 cap in the same match, those players are listed alphabetically by surname.

Isle of Man played their first match with T20I status on 21 August 2020 against Guernsey during a tour of Guernsey.

Key

List of players
Statistics are correct as of 26 February 2023.

References 

Isle of Man